Alternately Deep is the fifth studio album of original material by Roots Manuva. It was released on 13 March 2006 on the Big Dada label.

The album contains twelve tracks recorded during the sessions for his last studio album, Awfully Deep, including a remix of "Colossal Insight" and the track "Double Drat", which was previously only available via Roots Manuva's website. It features guest production from Colossus (King Kooba's Charlie Tate; Grown Man being an alternate version of Colossus' own released track You A Grown Man Now), Easy Access Orchestra, Lotek and Ricky Rankin. The song "No Love" is featured in two videogames: Need for Speed: Carbon and Test Drive Unlimited.

The album received generally positive reviews. Allmusic's John Bush praised the "digital distortion and bizarre, ringing tones" of the album's production, saying it "could well be a more satisfying listen" than Awfully Deep owing to its more relaxed and uncomplicated atmosphere.

Track listing

References 

2006 albums
Big Dada albums
Roots Manuva albums